Just Dance 2020 is a 2019 dance rhythm game developed and published by Ubisoft. It was unveiled on June 10, 2019, during its E3 press conference as the eleventh main installment of the series, in celebration of the Just Dance series' tenth anniversary, and released on November 5, 2019 for Nintendo Switch, Wii, PlayStation 4, Xbox One and Stadia. It was also the first game in the series to be released on Stadia. The game was exclusively released on the Nintendo Switch in Japan on March 12, 2020, and in China on December 24, 2020, in the latter of which the game is simply titled Just Dance.

Just Dance 2020 was the final Wii video game released physically in North America. It was reported in 2020 that Nintendo of America was no longer able to physically distribute Wii video games in that region because some of its departments no longer had the ability to retrieve the necessary equipment to do so. Consequently, this was the final video game in the main Just Dance series released on the Wii console, the platform where the series made its debut in 2009. By extension, this was the final Wii video game to be published by Ubisoft, the final Just Dance game to be released on a seventh-generation console, and the final Just Dance game to be available on a Nintendo optical disc.

Gameplay

As with the previous installments of the franchise, players must mimic the on-screen dancer's choreography to a chosen song using either motion controllers (excluding Stadia) or the game's associated smartphone app (except on the Nintendo Wii). The Stadia version also allows the use of a gamepad and a keyboard for menu navigation.

While the Wii version is based on Just Dance 2015, with the exclusion of the game's online features (the "Just Dance Wall" feature, the "challenge" feature, and the "World Dance Floor" mode), the game's user interface and features in the current gen and Stadia versions are largely identical to Just Dance 2019, with the addition of a new "All Stars" mode commemorating the franchise's tenth anniversary (which features a playlist of eleven songs: "Hot N Cold (Chick Version)" from Just Dance, "Rasputin" from Just Dance 2, "California Gurls" from Just Dance 3, "You're The First, The Last, My Everything" from Just Dance 4, "Starships" from Just Dance 2014, "Built For This" from Just Dance 2015, "Chiwawa" from Just Dance 2016, "Lean On" from Just Dance 2017, "Swish Swish" from Just Dance 2018, "Bang Bang Bang" from Just Dance 2019, and "High Hopes" from Just Dance 2020). The story of this mode follows the Panda on a trip across eleven planets aboard the "dance party bus", as he brings over coaches from each aftermentioned song featured in previous installments of the series to throw a dance party at the coliseum in the final planet. In the ending, the Reindeer jumped into the party via his ship, as another dance party was found on another galaxy, as they head towards the ship and sets off. Completing the mode will unlock "High Hopes" in Just Dance mode, which is also unlocked by entering the code before completing it. Co-op mode, returning from Just Dance 2016 and Just Dance 2017, has been revamped, using its traditional scoring system, allowing players to earn stars as a team. On February 28, 2023, The "All Stars" mode was shut down.

The Chinese version doesn't feature the traditional karaoke-styled lyrics and is instead replaced with scrolling lyrics that are translated to Chinese, even when in Kids Mode and the "World Dance Floor" mode, which is only matched with players across China in the Chinese version instead of being matched with players across the world in the International version. The Just Dance Unlimited service for the Chinese version is different than the International version, but it can't be used between both versions, as they are separate versions of the service. Furthermore, online multiplayer is added as an exclusive feature to the Chinese version to coincide with the release of Just Dance 2023 Edition. Unlike the said game, it's played in public parties of up to six players in custom playlists. However, the Chinese version's menu design is based on the current installment of the main series, which changes alongside its release, albeit with seasonal events, which temporary replaces it with a special menu design based on the current seasonal event. Starting from Season 7, the Sweat Mode is removed and it's instead replaced with a built-in kCal tracker shown below the player's name.

Soundtrack
The following songs appear on Just Dance 2020:

Kris Wu's "Big Bowl Thick Noodle" (also known as "Da Wan Kuan Mian") was included in initial pressings of the Chinese version of the game, but was removed shortly after its alternate version was released on China's Just Dance Unlimited servers due to sexual assault allegations against the artist. Following this, Phoenix Legend's "Coolest Ethnic" (also known as "Zui Xun Min Zu Feng"), which was previously exclusive to China's Just Dance Unlimited servers from February 5, 2021, was made available for free indefinitely.

Kids Mode
The following songs appear on the Kids Mode of the game:

Note: With the exception of "Into the Unknown", these songs also can be played on Wii.

Just Dance Unlimited 
Just Dance Unlimited continues to be offered on 2020 for eighth-generation consoles, featuring a streaming library of new and existing songs. The service also made its debut on Stadia with the release of 2020.

Songs exclusive to Just Dance Unlimited include:

Chinese servers 
Songs exclusive to the Chinese version of Just Dance Unlimited include:

Reception

Sales 
Just Dance 2020 debuted at #15 in the UK, with the Nintendo Switch version accounting for 55% of sales, followed by the Nintendo Wii at 21%, PlayStation 4 at 14%, and the Xbox One at 10%. The Nintendo Switch version of the game debuted at #3 in Taiwan, while the PlayStation 4 version debuted at #4 in South Korea. In Japan, the Switch version sold 2,533 copies during its first week of release, which made it the 26th bestselling retail game of the week.

Awards 
The game was nominated for "Best Family/Social Game" at the 2019 Titanium Awards, and for "Best Game-as-a-Service" at the Pégases Awards 2020.

References

External links

2019 video games
Dance video games
Fitness games
Just Dance (video game series)
Music video games
Kinect games
PlayStation 4 games
PlayStation Move-compatible games
Stadia games
Nintendo Switch games
Ubisoft games
Video games developed in France
Wii games
Xbox One games